Karl Ehrenbolger (born 13 November 1899, date of death unknown) was a Swiss football player who competed in the 1924 Summer Olympics. He was a member of the Swiss team, which won the silver medal in the football tournament.

References

External links
 DatabaseOlympics profile
 SportsReference profile

1899 births
Year of death missing
Swiss men's footballers
Footballers at the 1924 Summer Olympics
Olympic footballers of Switzerland
Olympic silver medalists for Switzerland
Switzerland international footballers
Olympic medalists in football
Association football forwards
Medalists at the 1924 Summer Olympics